Østervold Observatory (or Copenhagen University Observatory) is a former astronomical observatory (IAU code 035) in Copenhagen, Denmark owned and operated by the  University of Copenhagen (Københavns Universitet). It opened in 1861 as a replacement for the University's old observatory at Rundetårn.

History
 
The first astronomical observatory operated by the University of Copenhagen was Rundetårn. It had been inaugurated in 1642 as a replacement for Tycho Brahe's Stjerneborg, but during the early 19th century had become outdated as astronomical instruments grew bigger and bigger while the tower could not be expanded. In the same time, light pollution from the surrounding city as well as vibrations caused by the still increasing traffic in the streets below had made the observations inaccurate.

In 1861 the observatory was moved to Østervold, where a new observatory was constructed on the old bastioned fortifications of the city, which had become outdated and were being disabandonned. The well-known Russian-German astronomer, Heinrich Louis d'Arrest, who had been appointed professor in astronomy at the university in 1857, was chosen to plan the new observatory. He used the observatory for his study of nebulas, in 1867 publishing an astronomical catalogue of 1,942 nebulas with 4,900 positions. He also did significant work in spectroscopy, and discovered, for the first time, the differences in the evolutionary state and spatial distribution of stars. While d'Arrest used the main telescope, observer  H. C. F. C. Schjellerup used the Meridian circle for creating one of the most comprehensive astronomical catalogues of the time of stars of the 8th-9th magnitude: 10,000 positions on 259 observation nights.

The next director of the Østervold Observatory was Thorvald N. Thiele, a skilful mathematician who developed a new method of determining the orbit of Binary stars. He founded the tradition for numerical computational mathematics, which has lasted up to modern times.

In 1907, Elis Strömgren was appointed professor and director of the observatory, and under his direction the computational work continued.

During World War I, the Central Bureau for Astronomical Telegrams, founded by Astronomische Gesellschaft in 1882, was moved from Kiel, Germany, to the Østervold Observatory.  It remained located in Copenhagen until 1965, when it was moved to the Smithsonian Astrophysical Observatory, Cambridge, United States.

In 1940 Ellis Strömgren was succeeded by his son Bengt Strömgren, who made the pioneering discovery that hydrogen is the most abundant element in the stellar interior. He was also the first to make the correct interpretation of the Hertzsprung–Russell diagram (the relation between the total energy output from a star and its surface temperature was independently found by the Danish chemist and astronomer Ejnar Hertzsprung and the American astronomer Henry Norris Russell). Around 1950, he developed the uvbyß photoelectric system, which is still in use today.

It houses a 300 double reflector with a focal depth of 4.9m.

Building

The Østervold Observatory is a south-facing, three-winged building, designed by Christian Hansen. The central wing is topped by a dome. containing the main instrument. The side wings contained residences for the director, the observer as well as assistants. To secure the best possible foundation of the instruments, the foundation of the building rests on the original, true ground surface, penetrating the entire depth of the ramparts on which the building stands. This took 1/3 of the bricks used for the entire complex.

Instruments
The original main instrument of the observatory, housed in the dome, was a 280 mm refractor with a focal distance of 4.9 m. In 1895, this telescope was replaced by a 360 mm refractor with a focal length of 4.9 m and a 200 mm photographic lens with a focal length of 4.8 m. The purchase of the double refractor enabled the observatory to participate in photographic observations without having to give up visual observations. This double refractor is still found in the dome of the Østervold Observatory, while the 1861 refractor is displayed at the Steno Museum in Århus.
c

Directors

1862-1875: Heinrich Louis d'Arrest
1875-1907: Thorvald N. Thiele
1907-1940: Elis Strömgren
1940-1951. Bengt Strömgren

See also
 Brorfelde Observatory
 List of astronomical observatories
 Rundetårn

References

External links

History of Copenhagen University Observatory
Coords

Buildings and structures in Copenhagen parks
Astronomical observatories in Denmark
Historicist architecture in Copenhagen
1861 establishments in Denmark
Minor-planet discovering observatories